Mujum is a village and jamoat in north-west Tajikistan. It is located in Devashtich District in Sughd Region. The jamoat has a total population of 27,835 (2015). It consists of 10 villages, including Mujum (the seat) and Istiqlol.

References

Populated places in Sughd Region
Jamoats of Tajikistan